The Great Northern Derby was a set-weights thoroughbred horse race for three-year-old horses run over a distance of 2400 m at Ellerslie Racecourse in Auckland, New Zealand. It was discontinued in 1972 after being combined with the New Zealand Derby.

History

The inaugural running of the Derby was in May 1875, when racing was held at Ellerslie Racecourse for the first time. Just three horses took part, of which one was withdrawn before the start and another failed to complete the course, leaving Toi to finish the race and become the first Derby winner. In 1887 it was renamed the ARC Great Northern Derby Principal race over 12F

The race kept the name, the Great Northern Derby, regularly until 1973 when it was combined with the New Zealand Derby from Riccarton (Christchurch) to form one race, called the New Zealand Derby, which was from then onwards run at Ellerslie. Riccarton was instead given two 1600m races for three-year-olds in place of its Derby, the New Zealand 1000 Guineas and the New Zealand 2000 Guineas.

Only a small number of fillies,  including the great Desert Gold, have ever won the Derby against the male horses. Many of New Zealand's most famous racehorses feature on the Derby winners' list, including Kindergarten, Desert Gold, Mainbrace and Gloaming.

Winners 

 1972 - Corroboree
 1971 - Master John
 1970 - Kirrama
 1969 - Piko
 1968 - Bardall
 1967 - Ben Lomond
 1966 - Star Belle
 1965 - Peterman
 1964 - Sobig
 1963 - Ichtar
 1962 - Tatua
 1961 - Cracksman
 1960 - Stipulate
 1959 - Gitano
 1958 - Lawful
 1957 - Passive/Gibraltar
 1956 - Syntax
 1955 - Somerset Fair
 1954 - Fox Myth
 1953 - Programme
 1952 - Dalray
 1951 - Mainbrace
 1950 - Sweet Spray
 1949 - Tauloch
 1948 - Sweet Nymph
 1947 - Beau Le Havre
 1946 - Lady Foxbridge
 1945 - Coronaire
 1944 - Expanse
 1943 - Indian Princess
 1942 - Regal Fox
 1941 - Kindergarten
 1940 - Beau Vite
 1939 - Defaulter
 1938 - Courtcraft
 1937 - Essex
 1936 - Greek Shepherd
 1935 - Gay Blonde
 1934 - Red Manfred
 1933 - Silver Scorn
 1932 - Bronze Eagle
 1931 - Karapoti
 1930 - Hunting Cry
 1929 - Red Heckle
 1928 - Martarma
 1927 - Commendation
 1926 - Star Stranger
 1925 - Count Cavour
 1924 - Ballymena
 1923 - Enthusiasm
 1922 - Winning Hit
 1921 - Gasbag
 1920 - Royal Stag
 1919 - Gloaming
 1918 - Estland
 1917 - Sasanof
 1916 - Desert Gold
 1915 - Reputation
 1914 - Cherubini
 1913 - Bon Reve
 1912 - Counterfeit
 1911 - Danube
 1910 - Kilwinning
 1909 - Husbandman
 1908 - Boniform
 1907 - Zimmerman
 1906 - Multifid
 1905 - Gladstone
 1904 - Gladsome
 1903 - Wairiki
 1902 - Menschikoff
 1901 - Renown
 1900 - Miss Delaval
 1899 - Blue Jacket
 1898 - St. Crispin
 1897 - Nestor
 1896 - Fabulist
 1895 - Stepfeldt
 1894 - Loyalty
 1893 - St. Hippo
 1892 - Morion
 1891 - Medallion
 1890 - Tirailleur
 1889 - Cuirassier
 1888 - Sextant
 1887 - Disowned
 1886 - Foul Shot
 1885 - Tigridia
 1884 - Nelson
 1883 - Welcome Jack
 1882 - Fitz Hercules
 1881 - Tim Whiffler
 1880 - Libeller
 1879 - Omega
 1878 - Venus Transit
 1877 - Danebury
 1876 - Ariel
 1875 - Toi

See also

 New Zealand Derby
 New Zealand Derby (Riccarton)
 Thoroughbred racing in New Zealand

Horse races in New Zealand
Flat horse races for three-year-olds